Interphasma is a genus of Asian stick insects in the tribe Medaurini, erected by S.C. Chen and Y.H. He in 2008.  To date (2022), species have been recorded mostly from China, with one in Vietnam.

Species
The Phasmida Species File lists:
 Interphasma bifidum Chen & He, 2008
 Interphasma conicercum Chen & He, 2008
 Interphasma elongatum Ho, 2017
 Interphasma emeiense Chen & He, 2008
 Interphasma fanjingense Chen & He, 2008
 Interphasma guangxiense Chen & He, 2008
 Interphasma huanglianshanense Ho, 2017
 Interphasma huayingshanense Li, Shi & Wang, 2021
 Interphasma indistinctum Ho, 2022
 Interphasma leigongshanense Xu, Yang & Guo, 2010
 Interphasma lineatum Ho, 2020 (Vietnam only)
 Interphasma lizipingense Ho & Shi, 2013
 Interphasma longnanense Chen & He, 2008
 Interphasma lushanense Chen & He, 2008 - type species
 Interphasma marginatum Chen & Zhang, 2008
 Interphasma nigrolineatum Chen & He, 2008
 Interphasma pusillum Ho, 2022
 Interphasma robustum Ho, 2022
 Interphasma shaanxiense Chen & He, 2008
 Interphasma wolongense Chen & He, 2008
 Interphasma xinjiangense Chen & He, 2008
 Interphasma yunnanense Ho, 2022

References

External links

Phasmatodea genera
Phasmatodea of Asia
Phasmatidae